Errol Heights Park, also known as Errol Heights Natural Area, is a  public park in Portland, Oregon.

Description
Located in southeast Portland's Brentwood-Darlington neighborhood, the  park includes Oregon ash wetlands and Errol Creek which feeds into nearby Johnson Creek.

See also
 List of parks in Portland, Oregon

References

External links

 

Brentwood-Darlington, Portland, Oregon
Parks in Portland, Oregon